Bombardment is an attack by artillery fire directed against fortifications. It may also refer to:

Specific bombardments
Bombardment of Alexandria (1882)
Bombardment of Algiers (disambiguation) (several)
Bombardment of Brussels (1695)
Bombardment of Curaçao (1942)
Bombardment of Fort Stevens (1942)
Bombardment of Genoa (1684)
 Bombardment of Kagoshima (1863)
Bombardment of Madras (1914)
Bombardment of Papeete (1914)
Bombardment of Punta Sombrero (1847)
Bombardment of Shimonoseki (1863/64)
Bombardment of Tourane (1847)
Bombardment of Tourane (1856)

Other meanings
Kinetic bombardment in space warfare
Naval bombardment
Late Heavy Bombardment, a period in cosmology
Bombardment, a process in the manufacture of neon tubes
A variant of dodgeball

See also
Area bombardment
Bomb